Hugh Potter (1596 – 12 February 1662) was an English lawyer and politician who sat in the House of Commons  at various times between 1640 and 1662.

Potter was the son of Tobias Potter of Iddesleigh, Devon and his wife Susan Osborne, daughter of Hugh Osborne of Iddesleigh. He was baptised on 1 August 1596. He entered Lincoln's Inn in on 10 June 1615 and was called to the bar in 1622. He became secretary to Henry Percy, 9th Earl of Northumberland and was responsible for the Earl's estates.

In April 1640, Potter was elected Member of Parliament for Berwick upon Tweed in the Short Parliament. He was elected MP  Plympton Erle for the Long Parliament in November 1640. He sat until 1648 when he was excluded under Pride's Purge.

In 1661, Potter was elected MP for Cockermouth in the Cavalier Parliament and sat until his death in 1662. 
 
Potter died at the age of  65

References

 

1596 births
1662 deaths
Members of Lincoln's Inn
People from Berwick-upon-Tweed
Members of the Parliament of England for Plympton Erle
English MPs 1640 (April)
English MPs 1640–1648
English MPs 1661–1679